Unspeakable is a horror film directed by Thomas J. Wright. It was written by physician Pavan Grover who also stars in it. Produced in 2002, it was released in 2003.

Among the other performers who appear in the film are Dina Meyer (one of the main characters), Dennis Hopper, Jeff Fahey, Lance Henriksen, and Michelle Wolff.

Plot
A scientist (Meyer) uses technology to peer into the minds of death row inmates. After selecting one sociopath, a serial killer (Grover), she learns of his extrasensory abilities and much more.

Cast 
 Dina Meyer as Diana Purlow
 Pavan Grover as Jesse Mowatt
 Lance Henriksen as Jack Pitchford
 Dennis Hopper as Warden Earl Blakely
 Marco Rodríguez as Cesar Canales
 Jeff Fahey as Governor
 Jonathan Levit as Kenny
 Michelle Wolff as Jan Littlefield
 Miguel Pérez as Guard Lazarow
 Irene DeBari as Mowatt's Mother

Reception
The film has received especially negative reviews from the few professional movie critics who were willing to view and critique it. No critics reviews are listed on Rotten Tomatoes, and viewers rate it an average of 2.7 of 5 stars.

References

External links

2002 films
2002 horror films
2000s English-language films